Adrian Fry is a British freelance jazz trombonist, arranger and composer. He performed and recorded with many British bands including Back to Basie, Frank Griffith Nonet & Big Band, Elio Pace, Karen Sharp Quintet, Stan Tracey Big Band, Michael Garrick Jazz Orchestra, Don Weller Electric Octet & Big Band, the Pasadena Roof Orchestra, Bone Supremacy, and Pete Cater's Ministry of Jazz. His credits as a session musician include Albert Lee, Incognito, Katrina Leskanich and Shakin' Stevens. In 2010 he was Assistant Musical Director on BBC Radio 2's Weekend Wogan.

See also
 List of jazz arrangers

References

External links
 Official website
 Discogs artist profile

Living people
British jazz trombonists
Male trombonists
British music arrangers
21st-century trombonists
21st-century British male musicians
British male jazz musicians
Incognito (band) members
Year of birth missing (living people)